Dakleh Sara (also Romanized as Dākleh Sarā and Dakaleh Sarā) is a village in Chubar Rural District, Ahmadsargurab District, Shaft County, Gilan Province, Iran. At the 2006 census, its population was 150, in 41 families.

References 

Populated places in Shaft County